G100  may refer to:
 Gulfstream G100, an Israeli aircraft
 WXYY, a radio station licensed to Rincon, Georgia, United States

G.100 may refer to :
 Martinsyde G.100, a British First World War fighter bomber aircraft